Jonathan Henri Desire William Béhé (born 13 January 1989) is a French professional footballer of Ivorian origin who plays as a striker.

Career
Béhé began his career playing for the professional club Montpellier. After spending five years in the club's youth academy, he moved to Germany joining Hamburger SV. Béhé spent only six months at the club before returning to Montpellier where he was placed onto the club's Championnat de France amateur team in the fourth division. After six months in the reserves, he joined Guingamp but failed to make an appearance on the club's senior team only featuring in the reserves.

For the 2009–10 season, Béhé joined the semi-professional club SO Cassis Carnoux in the Championnat National, the third division of French football. He had a successful season with the club appearing in 27 total matches and converting ten goals. Following the season, on 18 May 2010, Béhé reached an agreement on a contract with professional club Le Mans who were previously relegated from the first division. On 14 June, the transfer became official with Béhé signing a three-year contract. He was assigned the number 10 shirt and made his professional debut on 30 July 2010 in a Coupe de la Ligue match against Le Havre. Béhé appeared as a substitute in a 2–1 defeat. He made his league debut a week later in a 2–0 victory over Nantes. During his time at Le Mans, he scored 6 goals in 25 appearances for the club.

In 2012, he was signed up by Luch-Energiya to play in Russia. He scored 3 goals in 13 appearances for the club. In 2013, he was signed up by the Thai side, BEC Tero Sasana F.C.  where he scored 7 goals in 28 appearances for the club. He was released in December 2013, after the club decided not to renew his contract. On 15 January  2014, he signed a 12 months  contract with Championnat de France Amateur 2 side, SC Le Las, scoring 14 goals in 30 appearances in the process, and helped the club to gain a second placing in the league, hence gaining promotion to Championnat de France Amateur, the fourth tier of the French football league. After the conclusion of his contract with SC Le Las, he was signed up by the Singapore side, Warriors FC.

Warriors FC
He joined Warriors FC in S.League ahead of the 2016 season. He scored on his debut for the Warriors from the penalty spot in the first game of the season. Béhé continued his fine goalscoring run by notching 3 goals in as many games, notching his new side a first win in the 3rd round of the 2016 S.League season. He notched his 7th goal in 8 games for the Warriors in the Uniformed Derby against Home United but could not secure all 3 points for the Warriors as they slumped to a 2-1 defeat. He notched his 16th league goal of the season for the Warriors in a surprising 2-0 win over the league leaders on 30 September 2016. He scored 19 goals in 23 games to end up as a joint second top goalscorer alongside Ken Ilsø for the 2016 S.League season.

After a season away, Behe rejoined the Warriors for the 2018 Singapore Premier League season. He marked his second debut for the club with a debut goal in the first match week of the 2018 Singapore Premier League season.
He has scored 4 goals out of 4 games.

Al-Nahda and Athlético Marseille
On 22 January 2020, Béhé moved to Omani club Al-Nahda Club (Oman) on a deal until the end of the season. He left the club at the end of his contract and then had a short spell back in France with Athlético Marseille in the Championnat National 3.

Career statistics

Club

References

External links
 
 
 

1989 births
Living people
Association football forwards
French footballers
French expatriate footballers
Footballers from Marseille
French sportspeople of Ivorian descent
Hamburger SV players
Montpellier HSC players
Le Mans FC players
FC Luch Vladivostok players
SO Cassis Carnoux players
SC Toulon-Le Las players
En Avant Guingamp players
Jonathan Behe
Sabah F.C. (Malaysia) players
Negeri Sembilan FA players
Warriors FC players
Al-Nahda Club (Oman) players
Athlético Marseille players
Ligue 2 players
Al Jeel Club players
Saudi First Division League players
French expatriate sportspeople in Germany
French expatriate sportspeople in Russia
French expatriate sportspeople in Thailand
French expatriate sportspeople in Singapore
French expatriate sportspeople in Malaysia
French expatriate sportspeople in Oman
French expatriate sportspeople in Saudi Arabia
Expatriate footballers in Germany
Expatriate footballers in Russia
Expatriate footballers in Thailand
Expatriate footballers in Singapore
Expatriate footballers in Malaysia
Expatriate footballers in Oman
Expatriate footballers in Saudi Arabia